A Regional Security Officer (RSO) is a special agent of the U.S. Diplomatic Security Service (DSS) in charge of a Regional Security Office. The RSO is the principal security attaché and advisor to the U.S. Ambassador at American embassies and consulates. Working for the United States Department of State as special agents, RSOs are also considered to be officers of the State Department acting as specialists within the United States Foreign Service. The RSO is also the senior law enforcement representative at a U.S. Embassy.

Authority and responsibilities
Working under the dual supervision of the Chief of Mission (Ambassador) and the Diplomatic Security Service, the RSO ensures that all mandated security programs are carried out. The word "regional" derives from a historical shortage of agents, leading to many embassies with no resident DSS Agent; often an RSO would have to oversee security at several embassies and consulates. Since virtually each embassy now has an RSO, the term is largely anachronistic. In some cases, an RSO may regionally oversee security at consulates and other U.S. presence facilities from an embassy within a country.    

At an embassy, the RSO reports directly to the Deputy Chief of Mission, who in turn reports directly to the Ambassador. Under the RSO's direct supervision are the following groups: U.S. Marine Security Guards, Assistant RSOs, local guards, foreign service national (FSN) investigators, an office management specialist and other secretarial and staff assistants, a Surveillance Detection Unit (with a mission of detecting hostile surveillance), security engineering officers, security technical specialists, as well as Navy Seabees assigned to post.

The RSO is in charge of security for all Americans assigned to an embassy (or on temporary duty to Post) that come under the authority of the Chief of Mission. The RSO's responsibility for security relates to personnel, information, physical security of embassy buildings and residences, as well as the conduct of criminal investigations, particularly those involving passport and visa fraud. At larger embassies having other law enforcement agencies in addition to the Diplomatic Security Service, the RSO chairs a law enforcement working group as the Ambassador's main law enforcement and security attaché/advisor. This group is composed of all other U.S. law enforcement agencies that may be represented at an embassy such as ICE/HSI, CBP, FBI/LEGAT (legal attaché), U.S. Secret Service, NCIS, AFOSI and others.  The working group ensures that the Ambassador is apprised of all significant law enforcement activity at post.

Fugitives
Since the Diplomatic Security Service is the most widely represented law enforcement organization in the world, its capability to track and capture fugitives who have fled U.S. jurisdiction to avoid prosecution is unmatched. During 2009, the DSS assisted in the resolution of 136 international fugitive cases around the globe. 

The role of the DSS in tracking international fugitives was highlighted in the movies Fast Five and Fast & Furious 6.

See also
 Ramzi Yousef
 Rewards for Justice Program

References

Relentless Pursuit: The DSS and the Manhunt for the Al-Qaeda Terrorists, Samuel M. Katz, 2002
 Targeted: Volume 1, The Evil Genius (Ramzi Yousef) (Wild Eyes Productions for the History Channel; A&E Television Networks) 2003

External links

 REWARDS FOR JUSTICE - DSS - Money for Information leading to the capture of Terrorists
  BBC article on DSS
  Pamphlet - DSS: A Global Law Enforcement Agency
 OFFICIAL U.S. Diplomatic Security Website
 U.S. Diplomatic Security History Book
 U.S. Diplomatic Security Photo Gallery
 U.S. Diplomatic Security Pictorial History
 U.S. Diplomatic Security testifies before Senate's Homeland Security & Governmental Affairs Subcmte, SD-342
 U.S. Diplomatic Security's Assistant Secretary of State testifies before the Senate C-SPAN
 U.S. Diplomatic Security's Assistant Secretary of State testifies before the Senate on 6/29/2011 C-SPAN
 DS on C-SPAN
 Diplomatic Security Special Agents Association
 Diplomatic Security - Office of Foreign Missions
 Diplomatic Security WASHINGTON POST article
 Diplomatic Security - Mobile Security Deployments (MSD)
 1996 Secretary of State Warren Christopher presents awards for valor to DSS Special Agents - Transcript
 DS Special Agents at the Olympics
 CBS Evening News - DSS at the UN General Assembly 2009
 CBS Evening News - Diplomatic Security Behind the Scenes
 CBS NEWS 6 June 2011 - Keeping U.S. Officials Safe Overseas - DSS 
 CBS Evening News 22 Sept 2011 - DSS: Inside Hillary Clinton's Security Bubble
 AMW - America's Most Wanted Interview of RSO Rob Kelty - Diplomatic Security Service - 11 min. 15 sec. into the segment. Segment aired on February 27, 2010 on AMW
 AMW - America's Most Wanted - Behind the Scenes: Belize - DSS Special Agent (RSO) Rob Kelty interviewed by John Walsh
 Former DS Special Agent tells Fox News that radical Muslim cleric lied to qualify for U.S.- funded college scholarship
 VISA SECURITY - Stratfor.com
 DSS Special Agent Randall Bennett investigates Wall Street Journal reporter Daniel Pearl's murder
 DSS Segments/Clips
 DSS and America's Most Wanted
 Diplomatic Security 2010 Year in Review - Vigilant In an Uncertain World
 Defense Standard Magazine, Winter 2010 Pg 76, Diplomatic Security - ACTIVE DIPLOMACY
 PROVIDING FALSE INFORMATION ON PASSPORT APPLICATIONS LEADS TO FEDERAL PROSECUTIONS
 Diplomatic Security Service Protecting U.S. Officials Overseas
 U.S. Investigates Syrian Diplomats for Spying on Protesters - State Department may limit their travel
 Female DSS Agents in ELLE Magazine
 Marine Museum honors partnership between Corps' Security Guard Program & Department of State's Diplomatic Security Service
 DS/HSI-ICE: Authorities Bust Strip Club Operation that Illegally Employed Hundreds by the Mob
 U.S. Diplomatic Security in Iraq After the Withdrawal
 L.A. arsons: Federal agent tips helped lead to suspect's capture
 C-SPAN Diplomatic Security in Libya - DS testifies before the House Committee Oversight and Reform
 Ambassador Kennedy comments on House Oversight testimony (11 minutes) 

Bureau of Diplomatic Security